Lamnostoma taylori is an eel in the family Ophichthidae (worm/snake eels). It was described by Albert William Herre in 1923, originally under the genus Caecula. It is a tropical, freshwater eel which is known from the Philippines in Asia, where it inhabits rivers near the sea.

Named in honor of herpetologist Edward H. Taylor (1889-1978), Chief of Fisheries in the Philippines.

References

Ophichthidae
Taxa named by Albert William Herre
Fish described in 1923